The 7th Chamber of Deputies is the legislature of the lower house of the Parliament of the Czech Republic following the 2013 legislative election, to elect 200 Members of Parliament (MPs).

Results of election (October 2013)

List of MPs (Deputies)

Notes

2013
2013 Czech legislative election